NARL may refer to:
 NARL, a section of Utqiagvik, Alaska, United States
 North American Rugby League, a professional rugby league in North America
 National Atmospheric Research Laboratory, an Indian research laboratory